The 20th Biathlon World Championships were held in 1983 for the second time in Antholz-Anterselva, Italy.

Men's results

20 km individual

10 km sprint

4 × 7.5 km relay

Medal table

References

1983
Biathlon World Championships
International sports competitions hosted by Italy
1983 in Italian sport
Biathlon competitions in Italy
February 1983 sports events in Europe
Sport in South Tyrol